Florence Perry (born 1992) is a British illustrator and writer, based in East London.

Biography
Perry's parents are Sir Grayson Perry and Lady Perry. She grew up in North London. She came out as a lesbian at age 15, later saying she was bisexual. She studied chemistry at Durham University and after graduating worked as an editor at BuzzFeed. Perry wrote and illustrated the book How to Have Feminist Sex (2019). She now lives in East London.

Publications

Publications by Perry
How to Have Feminist Sex: A Fairly Graphic Guide. Particular, 2019. .

Publications illustrated by Perry
The Girl's Guide To Growing Up Great. Green Tree, 2018. By Sophie Elkan. .
Remember This When You're Sad: a book for mad, sad and glad days. Lagom, 2018. By Maggy Van Eijk. .

References

External links

Living people
1992 births
21st-century British women writers
Queer writers
Queer feminists
British LGBT writers
Queer women
Alumni of Durham University